Hirata Station is the name of three train stations in Japan:

 Hirata Station (Kōchi)
 Hirata Station (Shiga)
 Hirata Station (Nagano)